The Gorgan is a left tributary of the river Cozd in Romania. It flows into the Cozd in Dacia.

References

Rivers of Romania
Rivers of Brașov County